Amblyomma nodosum is a species of specialized tick, found in three roadkilled giant anteaters from Minas Gerais, Brazil. There are 100 species of Amblyomma worldwide, 33 of which are from Brazil. A. nodosum is a specialist that lives exclusively on the giant anteater (Myrmecophaga tridactyla) and the Southern tamandua (Tamandua tetradactyla).

References

Amblyomma
Arachnids of South America
Endemic fauna of Brazil
Animals described in 1899